The North Fork Payette River Bridge near Smiths Ferry, Idaho is a historic reinforced concrete arch bridge built in 1933.  It was a work of Charles A. Kyle.  It has also been known as Rainbow Bridge and as 85-2114.

Its  span bridges across the North Fork Payette River.  It is significant as the longest single-span arch bridge in Idaho.  It is an open spandrel concrete arch bridge.  According to a scenic byways guide, "it remains today as a major achievement reflecting leading-edge bridge engineering at the time and shows a conscious effort to maintain the picturesque natural setting."

It was listed on the National Register of Historic Places in 1999.

References 

Road bridges on the National Register of Historic Places in Idaho
Bridges completed in 1933
Buildings and structures in Valley County, Idaho
National Register of Historic Places in Valley County, Idaho
Concrete bridges in the United States
Open-spandrel deck arch bridges in the United States